State Route 100 (SR 100) is a primary state highway in the U.S. state of Virginia.  The state highway runs  from U.S. Route 221 (US 221) in Hillsville north to SR 61 in Narrows.  SR 100 is one of the major highways of the New River Valley, connecting Narrows and Pearisburg in Giles County with Dublin, Pulaski (via US 11), and Interstate 81 (I-81) in Pulaski County.

Route description

SR 100 begins at an intersection with US 221 (Floyd Pike) at the eastern edge of the town of Hillsville.  The state highway heads north as two-lane undivided Sylvatus Smith Highway through northeastern Carroll County.  SR 100 passes through the hamlet of Sylvatus before entering Wythe County and crossing Little Reed Island Creek.  The state highway, whose name is now Wysor Highway, crosses the New River at Barren Springs then enters Pulaski County.  SR 100 continues north to its cloverleaf interchange with I-81 south of Draper Mountain.  The roadway continues north as US 11 (Lee Highway) across the mountain to Pulaski; US 11 also heads south along I-81 toward Wytheville.

SR 100 joins I-81 as the Interstate heads northeast toward Roanoke.  The two highways are paralleled by frontage roads as they pass through a diamond interchange with SR 658 (Greenbriar Road) at Draper and a partial cloverleaf interchange with SR 99 (Count Pulaski Drive) at McAdam.  The old alignment of SR 100, now designated SR F-047 (Kirby Road), continues to parallel the Interstate as the highways cross Peak Creek.  Near the community of Newbern, I-81 and SR 100 diverge at a diamond interchange that serves as the eastern terminus of SR F-047.

SR 100 heads north as Cleburn Boulevard, a four-lane divided highway that passes by the industrial area of Burlington Mills before passing under a rail spur that serves the Radford Army Ammunition Plant to the east.  Just north of the rail spur, the state highway enters the town of Dublin, where it crosses over Norfolk Southern Railway's Pulaski District rail line immediately before a partial cloverleaf interchange with US 11 (Lee Highway) adjacent to the main campus of New River Community College.  SR 100 passes New River Valley Airport before crossing Little Walker Mountain.  The northbound direction of the highway has a runaway truck ramp on the descent to Little Walker Creek, which the highway crosses while reducing to a two-lane undivided road just before entering Giles County at the south end of Little Walker Creek's gorge through Walker Mountain.

SR 100 continues north as Pulaski–Giles Turnpike, which crosses Walker Creek at its confluence with Little Walker Creek and intersects SR 42 (Blue Grass Trail) at Poplar Hill.  The state highway expands to a four-lane divided highway again at Staffordsville, north of which the highway leaves the vicinity of Walker Creek.  The two directions of SR 100 follow different alignments—northbound straight and southbound curvy—south of Pearisburg.  The state highway enters the town of Pearisburg on Main Street, which reduces to an undivided highway and then two lanes.  In the center of town, SR 100 intersects US 460 Business (Wenonah Avenue) and runs concurrently with the U.S. Highway on Main Street through downtown.  At the north end of downtown, SR 100 veers northwest on Main Street, which is again four lanes, while US 460 Business heads north to its terminus at US 460.  At the west end of town, SR 100 veers west onto two-lane Narrows Road, which parallels the south side of the New River and Norfolk Southern's East River District rail line to the town of Narrows.  The state highway enters town as Main Street and reaches its northern terminus at SR 61 (Monroe Street).

Major intersections

References

External links

Virginia Highways Project: VA 100

100
State Route 100
State Route 100
State Route 100
State Route 100